St. Patrick High School, St. Patrick's High School and other variants may refer to:

In Canada:
St. Patrick's High School (Halifax) in Halifax, Nova Scotia
St. Patrick's High School (Ottawa) in Ottawa, Ontario
St. Patrick's Catholic High School in Sarnia, Ontario
St. Patrick High School (Thunder Bay) in Thunder Bay, Ontario
St. Patrick Catholic Secondary School in Toronto
École St. Patrick High School in Yellowknife, Northwest Territories
St. Patrick's High School (Quebec City) in Quebec City, Quebec
St. Patrick Regional Secondary School in Vancouver, British Columbia

In India
St. Patrick's Higher Secondary School, Asansol, India
St. Patrick's High School, Secunderabad, India

In Kenya:
St. Patrick's High School (Iten, Kenya)

In Liberia:
St. Patrick's High School (Liberia)

In Pakistan
St Patrick's High School, Karachi, Sindh, Pakistan

In the United Kingdom:
 St Patrick's and St. Brigid's College, in Claudy, Northern Ireland
 St Patrick's High School (Keady), in Keady, Northern Ireland
 St Patrick's Roman Catholic High School, in Eccles, England

In the United States:
St. Patrick High School (Chicago), Illinois
St. Patrick's High School (Maysville, Kentucky)
St. Patrick High School (Portland, Michigan)
St. Patrick Catholic High School (Biloxi, Mississippi)
St. Patrick High School (North Platte, Nebraska)
St. Patrick High School (New Jersey) in Elizabeth, New Jersey

See also
St. Patrick's College (disambiguation)
St. Patrick's School (disambiguation)